Good Deeds and Dirty Rags is the first album from the Scottish group Goodbye Mr Mackenzie. It was released in the UK in 1989. The original LP was released with an accompanying 12" single.

Good Deeds and Dirty Rags was remastered in 1999 for the US market by record company Razor Tie.

Track listing
All tracks by Kelly/Metcalfe, except where noted.

Original release
"Open Your Arms"
"Wake It Up" (Kelly, Metcalfe, Baldwin)
"His Masters Voice"
"Goodwill City"
"Candlestick Park"
"Goodbye Mr Mackenzie"
"The Rattler"
"Dust"
"You Generous Thing You" (Kelly, Metcalfe, Scobie)
"Good Deeds" (Kelly, Metcalfe, Baldwin, Scobie)

CD bonus tracks
"Amsterdam"
"Calton Hill"
"Secrets"
"Knockin' on Joe" (Nick Cave)

LP bonus tracks (on bonus 12")
"Strangle"
"Extended Strangle"
"Secrets" (live)2
"Green Turned Red" (live)2

2Recorded live by Radio Clyde at the Pavilion Theatre, Glasgow on 23 November 1988.

1999 remaster
"Open Your Arms"
"Goodbye Mr Mackenzie"
"Goodwill City"
"Candlestick Park"
"Face to Face"
"Wake It Up" (Kelly, Metcalfe, Baldwin)
"The Rattler"
"Dust"
"You Generous Thing You" (Kelly, Metcalfe, Scobie)
"Good Deeds" (Kelly, Metcalfe, Baldwin, Scobie)
"Here Comes Deacon Brodie"
"Amsterdam"
"Calton Hill"
"Secrets"
"Knockin' on Joe" (Nick Cave)

Reception
Steve Aldrich of AllMusic gave the album 4.5 out of 5 stars, calling it an "excellent debut" that "draws from Bowie, Scott Walker-influences, yet maintains its own identity."

Personnel
Goodbye Mr Mackenzie
Martin Metcalfe - lead vocals
John Duncan - guitar 
Fin Wilson - bass guitar 
Shirley Manson - keyboards, backing vocals 
Rona Scobie - keyboards, backing vocals 
Derek Kelly - drums

Credits
 Mixed By - Pete Harris* (tracks: D1, D2)
 Producer - Mack (tracks: A1, A3 to A5, B1 to B5), Terry Adams (tracks: A2, C1, C2)

Chart performance

References

1989 debut albums
Goodbye Mr Mackenzie albums
Capitol Records albums